The Yaeyama keelback (Hebius ishigakiensis) is a species of snake of the family Colubridae. The snake is endemic to Ishigaki and Iriomote in the Yaeyama Islands of southernmost Japan.

See also
 List of reptiles of Japan

References

ishigakiensis
Endemic reptiles of Japan
Fauna of the Ryukyu Islands
Yaeyama Islands
Reptiles described in 1960